Juliette Anne Haigh (born 4 August 1982), also known by her married name Juliette Drysdale but better known by her maiden name, is a retired professional rower.

Haigh was born in 1982 in Auckland, New Zealand. Her parents are Penny and John Haigh. She knew that she wanted to compete at Olympic Games as a child but had not chosen a sport yet. She started rowing while she attended Takapuna Grammar School. Haigh has studied public relations at the University of Auckland, the University of Waikato, and Massey University.

Haigh was in the New Zealand Women's Pair from 2004 to 2008 with Nicky Coles, then returned to the event after a year out and partnered Rebecca Scown in the boat. She won a gold medal in the women's pair at the World Rowing Cup regatta in Lucerne, 2010 and followed this by winning the 2010 World Rowing Championships in Lake Karapiro. Haigh and Scown won the bronze medal at the 2012 Summer Olympics in the same event. Haigh officially announced her retirement from competitive rowing on 2 December 2012.

After having been together for six years, Haigh got engaged to fellow New Zealand rower Mahé Drysdale in 2013. They first met in 2001 when they were both members of Auckland's West End Rowing Club. They became close friends and later flatted together. They married later in 2013 and spent their honeymoon on Mahé in the Seychelles; her husband is named for the island but had never been there before. The Drysdales had a girl in October 2014 and they live on a farm in Cambridge.

References

External links

Video interview with Rebecca Scown and Juliette Haigh

Living people
1982 births
Rowers from Auckland
Olympic rowers of New Zealand
Olympic bronze medalists for New Zealand
Rowers at the 2004 Summer Olympics
Rowers at the 2008 Summer Olympics
Rowers at the 2012 Summer Olympics
New Zealand female rowers
Olympic medalists in rowing
Medalists at the 2012 Summer Olympics
People educated at Takapuna Grammar School
World Rowing Championships medalists for New Zealand